Burk House may refer to:
J.M. Burk House, a historic house in Geneva, Nebraska, US
Alfred E. Burk House, a historic house in Philadelphia, Pennsylvania, US

See also
 Burk (disambiguation)
 Burks House (disambiguation)